The 1934 Wofford Terriers football team represented Wofford College as a member of the Southern Intercollegiate Athletic Association (SIAA) during the 1934 college football season. Led by first-year head coach Jules Carson, the Terriers compiled an overall record of 4–4–1 with a mark of 2–3–1 in conference play, tying for 19th place in the SIAA.

Schedule

References

Wofford
Wofford Terriers football seasons
Wofford Terriers football